Zhang Yang (August 1951 – November 23, 2017) was a general in the Chinese People's Liberation Army (PLA) who served as Director of the Political Work Department. He was previously political commissar of the Guangzhou Military Region. He committed suicide in November 2017 when under disciplinary investigation.

Biography
Zhang was born in Wuqiang County, Hebei Province. He graduated from the basic department of PLA National Defense University, and also studied at the Communist Party of China (CPC) Central Party School, majoring in administrative management. He was the director of the political department and a standing committee member of the CPC committee of the Guangzhou Military Region. From September 2007 to December 2015, he was political commissar and CPC party chief of the Guangzhou Military Region. He attained the rank of lieutenant general in July 2006 and general in July 2010.

Zhang was a member of the 17th and 18th Central Committees of the Communist Party of China and a deputy to the 10th National People's Congress.

Zhang Yang was under investigation by the Central Military Commission on August 28, 2017, for discipline violations and bribery. He is believed to have committed suicide at his home on November 23, 2017, making him the most senior military figure to have done so during the ongoing graft investigations among PLA personnel. On October 16, 2018, Zhang Yang was posthumously stripped of his rank and expelled from the Communist Party.

References

1951 births
2017 deaths
Delegates to the 10th National People's Congress
Delegates to the 12th National People's Congress
Members of the 17th Central Committee of the Chinese Communist Party
Members of the 18th Central Committee of the Chinese Communist Party
People from Hengshui
People's Liberation Army generals from Hebei
PLA National Defence University alumni
Suicides in the People's Republic of China
Chinese military personnel who committed suicide
Expelled members of the Chinese Communist Party
Suicides by hanging in China